Pseudorthoceratidae is an extinct family of actively mobile aquatic carnivorous cephalopods belonging to the subclass Orthoceratoidea endemic to what would be North America, Asia, and Europe during the Silurian living from 460.5—251 Ma, existing for approximately .

In life, these animals may have been similar to the modern squid, except for the long shell. The internal structure of the shell consists of concavo-convex chambers linked by a centrally-placed tube called a siphuncle.

Taxonomy
Pseudorthoceratidae was named by Flower and Caster (1935). It was assigned to Pseudorthocerataceae by Sweet (1964) and Teichert et al. (1964); to Orthocerida by Frey (1995); and to Pseudorthocerida by Barskov (1968) and Kröger (2008).

See also

References

Orthoceratoidea
Prehistoric cephalopod families
Silurian cephalopods
Silurian cephalopods of North America
Paleozoic cephalopods of Asia
Paleozoic cephalopods of Europe
Silurian first appearances
Silurian extinctions